This is a list of aircraft squadrons of the Sri Lanka Air Force.

Current SLAF Flying Squadrons
No. 1 Flying Training Wing
No. 2 Heavy Transport Squadron
No. 3 Maritime Squadron
No. 4 VIP Helicopter Squadron
No. 5 Jet Squadron 
No. 6 Helicopter Squadron
No. 7 Helicopter Squadron
No. 8 Light Transport Squadron
No. 9 Attack Helicopter Squadron
No. 10 Fighter Squadron 
No. 111 Air Surveillance Squadron
No. 112 Air Surveillance Squadron
No. 14 Squadron

Air Defence 
 No. 01 Air Defence Radar Squadron, SLAF Katunayake
No. 02 Air Defence Radar Squadron, SLAF Vavuniya
No. 03 Air Defence Radar Squadron, SLAF Wirawila
No. 04 Air Defence Radar Squadron, SLAF Mirigama
No. 05 Air Defence Radar Squadron, SLAF Palavi
No. 06 Air Defence Radar Squadron, SLAF China Bay
 No. 07 Air Defence Radar Squadron, SLAF Station Piduruthalagala

Other 
No. 49 Chemical Biological Radiological Nuclear and Explosive Wing
Fire School & Fire Tender Maintenance Squadron, SLAF Katunayake
Special Airborne Wing

Former SLAF Squadrons
No. 12 Squadron

References

Sri Lanka Air Force Bases
www.scramble.nl Order of Battle at Scramble

Sri Lanka Air Force
Air Force